"Step That Step" is a song written by Mark Miller, and recorded by American country music group Sawyer Brown.  It was released in January 1985 as the second single from their self-titled debut album.  It was their first number-one hit on both the Billboard Hot Country Songs chart and the Canadian RPM country singles chart.

Music video
The music video was directed by Mark Rezyka and David Hogan and premiered in February 1985. It was filmed in Los Angeles, California.

Charts

Weekly charts

Year-end charts

References

1985 singles
1984 songs
Sawyer Brown songs
Songs written by Mark Miller (musician)
Capitol Records Nashville singles
Curb Records singles